Pudozh (or ) is a town and the administrative center of Pudozhsky District of the Republic of Karelia, Russia, located on the Vodla River  east of Petrozavodsk, but  traveling by the road around Lake Onega. Population:    8,000 (1970).

An international tourist route Blue Highway ends in Pudozh. The route leads from Norway via Sweden and Finland to Republic of Karelia.

History
It was first mentioned in 1382 as a settlement of Pudoga, which would later be called Pudozhsky Pogost. It was granted town status in 1785.

Administrative and municipal status
Within the framework of administrative divisions, Pudozh serves as the administrative center of Pudozhsky District, to which it is directly subordinated. As a municipal division, the town of Pudozh, together with eleven rural localities, is incorporated within Pudozhsky Municipal District as Pudozhskoye Urban Settlement.

References

Notes

Sources

Cities and towns in the Republic of Karelia
Pudozhsky District
Pudozhsky Uyezd
Monotowns in Russia